Rod, Rodney, or Roderick Carr may refer to:

 Rod Carr (administrator), New Zealand businessman and university administrator
 Rod Carr (boxer) (born 1968), Australian boxer
 Roderick Carr (1891–1971), Royal Air Force officer from New Zealand